The 2015 Peterborough City Council election took place on 7 May 2015 to elect members of Peterborough City Council in England. This was on the same day as other local elections.

Election result

Ward results

Bretton North

Bretton South

Central

Dogsthorpe

East

Fletton and Woodston

North

Northborough

Orton Longueville

Orton Waterville

Orton with Hampton

Park

Paston

Ravensthorpe

Stanground Central

Stanground East

Werrington North

Werrington South

West

By-elections

West

A by-election was called due to the resignation of Cllr Nick Arculus.

References

2015 English local elections
May 2015 events in the United Kingdom
2015
2010s in Cambridgeshire